Kickin' the Crown Around is a 1933 American Pre-Code film featuring the comedy team Clark and McCullough and directed by Sam White.

Plot summary 
The two reeler short comedy is set in the mythical country of Jugo-Jaggon, where the manufacture, sale, or possession of salami is prohibited by law. Despite this, the country is in the grip of a salami addiction crisis. International Agents Blackstone and Blodgett (Clark and McCullough) are hired by Nikki (Charles Irwin), the Prime Minister, to find out who is smuggling 4% garlic salami into the kingdom.

Blackstone and Blodgett accidentally intercept a secret message that reveals that the illegal salami is being delivered to the Wiggle Inn. Posing as waiters, they capture the smuggler Disputin (Francis McDonald) at the inn and attempt to interrogate him, but he refuses to talk even after being squirted with seltzer water. Leaving Disputin tied to a chair, Blackstone and Blodgett report their progress to King Pfui (Ferdinand Munier), who is impressed but suggests that a fire hose might be more effective.

Little do any of them suspect that Queen Olga (Leni Stengel), with her Ladies in Waiting, is the mastermind behind the smuggling ring. When nobody is watching, she unties Disputin and takes his place in the chair.

When King Pfui is led to the captive, he is outraged to find the queen tied up, and threatens to have Blackstone's and Blodgett's heads—but they are saved when the ceiling collapses under the weight of the six tons of salami hidden there. As masses of contraband sausage rain down on the group, Blackstone declares the whole affair "just a lot of baloney".

Cast 
Bobby Clark as Blackstone - The "Diplomat"
Paul McCullough as Blodgett
Ferdinand Munier as King Pfui
Leni Stengel as The Queen
Francis McDonald as Disputin
Eddie Baker as Manager - Wiggle Inn
Neal Burns as Messenger
Charles Irwin as Nikki, the Prime Minister

References

External links 

1933 films
1933 comedy films
RKO Pictures short films
American black-and-white films
American comedy short films
Films directed by Sam White (film producer)
1930s English-language films
1930s American films